Big Brother is a 2018 Hong Kong action drama film directed by Kam Ka-wai and starring Donnie Yen and Joe Chen. The film was released on 16 August 2018.

Plot
A high school is in crisis, the students are under-performing and preoccupied with non-academic activities. Henry Chen, aka Big Brother, a teacher with rather rusty writing skills yet armed with the most knowledgeable fists and heart of steel, comes to enlighten and inspire the students with his unconventional teaching methods. Just as the kids are improving their work and enjoying the merits of the educational system, trouble follows. An opportunistic entrepreneur creates havoc by sending in a motley gang of fighters to win over the land in order to turn the all ready failing school into an apartment complex. Their approach is not all that persuasive with Chen as he and his beloved class are going to give the unwelcome guests the benefits of a real education.

Cast
Donnie Yen as Henry Chen (陳俠), instructor of Tak Chi Secondary School's 6B class who is an alumnus of the school himself. A troubled youth in the past, he was sent to the United States to attend military boarding school. Eventually he served as a Marine for the United States Marine Corps. He was persuaded by his former principal to teach at his alma meter, where he uses unconventional methods to help his students.
Chaney Lin as child Henry Chan.
Joe Chen as Leung Wing-sum (梁穎心), as honors class teacher at Tak Chi who is very patient with her students.
Lok Ming-kit as Jack Li (李偉聰), Chan's student who lives with his grandmother after his parents were killed in a car accident and works for Law after class hoping to buy a large home for his grandmother.
Yu Kang as Kane Law (羅健英), a triad leader who wants to acquire Tak Chi's land. He was Chan's rival during their childhood where Chan broke his hand during a fight, forcing him to give up his passion of playing piano.
Wen Zhi as child Kane Law
Bruce Tong as Bruce Kwan (關啟程), Chan's student who has ADHD
Chris Tong as Chris Kwan (關啟賢), Chan's student and Bruce's younger brother who is addicted to online games due to his mother's abandonment and father's alcoholism.
Gladys Li as Gladys Wong (王得男), Chan's student who is a tomboy who dreams to be a Formula One racer despite her family's objections.
Gordon Lau as Gordon Hong (項祖發), Chan's student who is of Pakistani descent who loves to sing but faces discrimination due to his skin color.
Dominic Lam as Patrick Lam (林國強), the current principal of Tak Chi Secondary School.
Alfred Cheung as Chief Wong (黃高官)
Bowie Wu as Fong Shu-yan (方樹人), the former principal of Tak Chi Secondary School who persuaded Chan to teach at his alma meter.
Felix Lok as the Kwan brothers' father who turned to alcoholism due to his wife leaving him for a rich man and neglects communication with his sons as a result.
Benjamin Au-yeung as Ben Sir, a teacher at Tak Chi.
Billy Lau as Gladys' father who opposes his daughter to pursue her dream.
Lee Fung as Jack's grandmother.
Koo Tin-nung as Boss Cheung (張老闆)

Reception

Box office
The film grossed a total of US$22,029,250 worldwide, combining its box office gross from Hong Kong, China, North America and Australia.

In Hong Kong, the film grossed HK$7,253,433 during its theatrical run from 16 August to 3 October 2018.

In China, the film grossed a total of CN¥146,303,000 at the box office.

Critical reception
Simon Abrams of RogerEbert.com gave the film a score of 2.5 stars, criticizing some of the feel-good, but praises Donnie Yen's performance.

See also
Donnie Yen filmography

References

External links

大師兄 Big Brother on Facebook

2018 films
2018 action drama films
2018 martial arts films
Hong Kong action drama films
Hong Kong martial arts films
Mixed martial arts films
2010s Cantonese-language films
Films about teacher–student relationships
Films set in schools
Films set in Hong Kong
Films shot in Hong Kong
Triad films
2010s Hong Kong films